Mohammad Vahid Esmaeil Beigi is an Iranian football defender who plays for Saipa in Iran's Premier Football League.

Club career
In the 2011–12 season, he made 22 appearances providing one assist for his team mates and in the 2012–13 season he played 13 games for his club scoring a goal against Rah Ahan in a 4–0 win. He also provided one assist throughout the season.

Career statistics

Assists

International career

Under-22 team
He was called up by Ali Reza Mansourian to participate in the Iran U-22 team's training camp in Italy.

Junior team
He made his debut under Carlos Queiroz on 15 December 2012 against Yemen in 2012 WAFF.

Honours
Mes Kerman
Hazfi Cup Runner-up (1): 2013–14

References

External links 
Mohammad Vahid Esmaeil Beigi at PersianLeague.com

1992 births
Living people
Iranian footballers
Association football defenders
Iran international footballers
Sanat Mes Kerman F.C. players
Saipa F.C. players
People from Kerman